Ludwig Bussler (26 November 1838 – 18 January 1900) was a German musical instructor, critic and conductor. He was born in Berlin. His father, Robert Bussler, was a painter, author and privy counsellor. He was a pupil of A.E. Grell, Siegfried Dehn (theory), and W.E. Wieprecht (instrumentation). He died in Berlin.

Career 
 He was for a time a musical director at Memel, East Prussia (now known as Klaipėda, part of Lithuania). 
 1865 - 1874: taught theory at the Ganz School of Music (later the Schwantzer Conservatory).
 1874 - 1877: nominated professor at the Mohr Conservatory.   In
 1877-1879: resumed his post at the Schwantzer Conservatory. 
 From 1879, he taught theory at the Stern Conservatory, receiving the title of royal professor in 1898.
 In 1883 he was appointed music critic of the Berlin National Zeitung. He also wrote for other Berlin journals.
 He was also a conductor at various Berlin theatres.

Publications 
 Musikalische Elementarlehre. Berlin: 1867; 16th ed., 1926; Eng. trans., 1890; 
 Praktische Harmonielehre in Aufgaben. Berlin: 1875; Eng. trans., 1896.
 Der Strenge Satz. Berlin: 1877;
 Harmonische Übungen am Klavier. Berlin: 1878; Eng. trans., 1890;
 Kontrapunkt und Fuge im freien Tonsatz. Berlin: 1878;
 Musikalische Formenlehre. Berlin: 1878; Eng. trans., 1883.;
 Praktische musikalische Kompositionslehre. 2 pts., Berlin: 1878-79); 
 Elementarmelodik. Berlin: 1879.
 Geschichte der Musik. Berlin: 1882; 
 Partiturstudium (Modulationslehre). Berlin: 1882.
 Lexikon der musikalischen Harmonien. Berlin: 1889.

References 

1838 births
1900 deaths
German music educators
German music critics
German conductors (music)
German male conductors (music)
German writers about music
19th-century German journalists
German male journalists
German journalists
Pupils of Siegfried Dehn
19th-century conductors (music)
19th-century German musicians
19th-century German male writers
19th-century German writers